Horahora is a suburb on the southwestern side of Whangārei, in Northland, New Zealand.

According to the 2013 New Zealand census, Horahora has a population of 1,053, an increase of 27 people since the 2006 census.

Education
Hora Hora School is a co-educational contributing primary (years 1–6) school with a roll of  students as of  The school opened in 1893 and moved to its present site in 1925.

Sport
The suburb of Horahora is home to many sports teams including;

Rugby
Hora Hora RFC (also known as Hora Hora) is a rugby club located on Te Mai Road, Whangarei, New Zealand. The premier club currently participates in the Northland Rugby Football Union's (NRFU's) South Zone premier competition.

Notes

External links
 Hora Hora School website

Suburbs of Whangārei